Babati Urban District (or Babati Town Council) is one of the six districts of the Manyara Region of Tanzania. Babati Urban District is surrounded by Babati Rural District. The administrative capital of the district is Babati town.

According to the 2012 Tanzania National Census, the population of Babati Urban District was 93,108.

Transport
Paved trunk road T14 from Singida connects with trunk road T5 in Babati Urban District. Trunk road T5 from Dodoma to Arusha passes through the district; it is paved from Babati up to Arusha.

Administrative subdivisions
As of 2012, Babati Urban District was administratively divided into 8 wards.

Wards

 Babati
 Bagara
 Bonga
 Maisaka
 Mutuka
 Nangara
 Sigino
 Singe

References

Babati District